María Francesca Caldentey Oliver (born 19 March 1996), known as Mariona Caldentey or simply Mariona, is a Spanish professional footballer who plays as a forward for Liga F club FC Barcelona and the Spain women's national team.

Early life 
María Francesca Caldentey Oliver was born in the Mallorcan town of Felanitx to father Miguel Ángel Caldentey and mother María Oliver. Her father was a football coach and her mother is a nurse by profession. She also has an older brother.

Caldentey began playing football at the age of four in her local team as an after-school activity. She later played futsal in Manacor, where she won multiple titles and played in three Spanish championships. Although Caldentey did not develop in La Masia, she has had a lifelong connection to FC Barcelona; her father was one of the promoters of Els Tamarells, one of Barcelona’s biggest penyes.

Club career

Collerense
Caldentey developed through the ranks of the UD Collerense youth system.

Barcelona
On 30 July 2014, Caldentey signed for Barcelona after her successes in the U19 European Championship.
Throughout the 2014–2015 season, 
she made her Copa de la Reina debut in the quarterfinals of the 2015 tournament and scored in a 4–0 win versus Levante. Barcelona would exit the tournament in the next round against Valencia.

International career

Youth
Caldentey earned third place at the 2013 UEFA Women's U17 Championship, representing Spain. In the semifinals of the tournament, she converted her penalty in the shootout against Sweden, but would end up losing the match after the shootout ended 4–5 in Sweden's favor. In the third place match, Caldentey captained the team and scored in the 42nd minute in an 0–4 rout of Belgium.

She found more success during the 2014 UEFA Women's U19 Championship. Caldentey started every game in the tournament, along with scoring the first goal in the semifinal match versus Norway. She started in the final, where Spain lost against the Netherlands via a Vivianne Miedema chip in the 21st minute.

Caldentey also participated in the 2016 U20 Women's World Cup, where she scored twice in the group stage against Canada and Japan. Spain were eliminated in extra time of the quarterfinal against eventual champions North Korea. Her goal against Canada was named goal of the tournament.

Senior
In 2017, Caldentey earned her first senior national team call-up when Jorge Vilda named her to Spain's squad for two friendlies against Switzerland. Two months later, she made her international debut in an Algarve Cup match versus Japan, subbing on in the 73rd minute for Amanda Sampedro. Spain went on to the final against Canada and won the tournament, earning Caldentey her first international title.

Caldentey scored her first senior international goal in a friendly match against Belgium.

She was called up to the squad for the 2017 UEFA Women's EURO. Caldentey started in two group stages games- a win against Portugal and a loss against Scotland. After Spain qualified for the knockout rounds on their head-to-head record, she started the quarterfinal match against Austria but was subbed out in the 56th minute. Spain exited the tournament after a penalty shootout.

In 2019, Caldentey was called up to represent Spain in the 2019 Algarve Cup, where Spain finished 7th place. She was also named to the Spain squad for the 2019 FIFA Women's World Cup. She started each match in the group stage of the tournament, where Spain received four points and moved on to the Round of 16 for the first time in their history. In the Round of 16 match, she subbed in at the 83rd minute for Virginia Torrecilla, and Spain would end up losing to eventual champions, the United States.

Career statistics
Scores and results list Spain's goal tally first, score column indicates score after each Caldentey goal.

Honours
Barcelona
Primera División: 2014–15, 2019–20, 2020–21, 2021–22
UEFA Women's Champions League: 2020–21;
 Copa de la Reina de Fútbol: 2017, 2018, 2020, 2021
 Supercopa Femenina: 2019–20, 2021–22
 Copa Catalunya: 2014, 2015, 2016, 2017

Spain
 UEFA Women's Under-19 Championship: runner-up 2014
 Algarve Cup: 2017

References

External links
 
 Mariona Caldentey at FC Barcelona
 Mariona Caldentey at BDFutbol
 
 
 
 
 Mariona Caldentey at Txapeldunak.com 
 

1996 births
Living people
People from Felanitx
Footballers from Mallorca
Spanish women's footballers
Women's association football forwards
FC Barcelona Femení players
Primera División (women) players
Spain women's youth international footballers
Spain women's international footballers
2019 FIFA Women's World Cup players
UEFA Women's Euro 2022 players
UEFA Women's Euro 2017 players
21st-century Spanish women